Cheung Shek, formerly called Cheung Shan, is one of the 17 constituencies in the Tsuen Wan District. The constituency returns one district councillor to the Tsuen Wan District Council, with an election every four years.

Cheung Shek constituency is loosely based on Cheung Shan Estate and part of the Shek Wai Kok Estate with estimated population of 13,351.

Councillors represented

Cheung Shan (1994–2003)

Cheung Shek (2003 to present)

Election results

2010s

2000s

1990s

References

Tsuen Wan
Constituencies of Hong Kong
Constituencies of Tsuen Wan District Council
2003 establishments in Hong Kong
Constituencies established in 2003
1994 establishments in Hong Kong
Constituencies established in 1994